Verka Junction (station code: VKA) is located in Amritsar district in the Indian state of Punjab and serves Verka town, which is a suburb of Amritsar city. Verka station falls under Firozpur railway division of Northern Railway zone of Indian Railways.

Overview 
This station is located on the single track,  broad gauge, Amritsar–Pathankot line which was established in 1884. Verka station is also the junction and origin station for single track Verka–Dera Baba Nanak line.

Electrification 
Verka railway station is situated on single track DMU Amritsar–Pathankot line and single track DMU Verka–Dera Baba Nanak line. It was reported in April 2019 that the electrification of the single track BG Amritsar–Pathankot line had commenced and the survey for electrification of Verka–Dera Baba Nanak line had started.

Amenities 
Verka railway station has 1 booking windows, no enquiry office and just very basic amenities like drinking water, public toilets, sheltered area with adequate seating etc. The station had small footfall of 1343 persons per day in 2018 and wheelchair availability was not there for disabled persons. There are two platforms at the station, both interconnected with the help of a foot overbridge (FOB).

References

External links 

 Pictures of Verka Junction railway station

Railway stations in Amritsar district
Firozpur railway division